Arne Gaupset (16 April 1894 – 18 February 1976) was a Norwegian sport wrestler. He was born in Kristiansund and represented the club IL Braatt. He competed at the 1924 Summer Olympics, when he placed tied fifth in Greco-Roman wrestling, the lightweight class.

References

External links
 

1894 births
1976 deaths
Sportspeople from Kristiansund
Olympic wrestlers of Norway
Wrestlers at the 1924 Summer Olympics
Norwegian male sport wrestlers